Narayanan Valiya Kollery was a sound recordist from Mahé in Kerala, India.

Work
Kollery worked as a sound recordist and mixer in Paris, France and worked on the following films:

 1985 - 	Asterix Versus Caesar 	 - sound recordist
 1983 - 	The Moon in the Gutter 	 - sound mixer
 1980 - 	Fantômas 	         - sound mixer
 1978 - 	The Spat 	         - sound mixer
 1977 - 	Why Not! 	         - sound mixer
 1976 - 	Néa 	                 - sound mixer
 1976 - 	The Wing and the Thigh 	 - sound mixer
 1975 - 	Black Moon 	         - sound recordist
 1975 - 	Chobizenesse 	         - sound mixer
 1974 - 	My Little Loves 	 - sound mixer
 1973 - 	Don't Know Anything But I'll Tell All 	- sound re-recording mixer

He received a César Award for his work in the movie Black Moon.

Personal life
He has a son named Christophe Valiya-Kollery, born in the 1960s.

Nara Kollery died in Paris on 9 December 2015.

References

 

Sound recordists
2015 deaths